Isakson Nunatak is a nunatak rising to about ,  southeast of Christoph Nunatak in the Lyon Nunataks of Palmer Land, Antarctica. It was mapped by the United States Geological Survey from surveys and U.S. Navy aerial photographs, 1961–68, and Landsat imagery, 1973–74. The nunatak was named by the Advisory Committee on Antarctic Names in 1987 after Steven W. Isakson of Stanford University, an upper atmospheric physicist at Siple Station, winter party 1975.

References

Nunataks of Palmer Land